Ladki is a 1953 Indian Hindi-language romantic comedy film written by V. S. Venkatasalam and directed by M. V. Raman. The film stars Bharat Bhushan, Kishore Kumar, Vyjayanthimala, Anjali Devi in lead roles, along with Om Prakash, Leela Mishra, Raj Mehra,  Chittor V. Nagaiah were in supporting roles. The film was produced by A. V. Meiyappan of AVM Productions. The film's score was composed by R. Sudarsanam and Dhaniram, edited by K. Shankar and M. V. Raman and was filmed by Yusuf Mulji and T. Muthu Sami.

Plot 
Rani, a feminist, is best friends with Kamini, much to the disapproval of her mother, since Kamini's father had married a woman of low caste. They meet Raja, a medical student, and Kishore. After the initial tussle, Raja and Kamini fall in love while Kishore likes Rani. Rani goes to Colombo for the University Sports Tournament, and while winning every single event she enters there, she injures her leg and is in hospital. Meanwhile, Kamini and Raja marry secretly, since he knows his woman-hating, upper caste father will never agree to this marriage. Captain Sundar, Kamini's childhood friend, comes from Rangoon and wants to marry Kamini, but is shattered as he finds out she is married to Raja. Raja's parents are told of the wedding and they call him home asking him to forget the marriage and marry a girl of their choice. Raja refuses and goes back to Kamini and misunderstands the situation when he sees Kamini with Sundar. He returns to his parents and tells them he's willing to marry the girl of their liking who turns out to be Rani, having returned from Colombo. Kamini, devastated by Raja's betrayal, decides to commit suicide. Finally with Kishore and Sundar's help, everything is sorted out and Raja is re-united with Kamini, while Kishore marries Rani.

Cast
 Bharat Bhushan as Raja
 Kishore Kumar as Kishore
 Vyjayanthimala as Rani 
 Anjali Devi as Kamini
 Om Prakash as Hazurdas
 Leela Mishra as Mrs. Hazurdas
 Raj Mehra as Rani's Father
 Chittor V. Nagaiah as Kamini's Father
 Randhir as Nainsukh

Production 
Ladki was produced by A. V. Meiyappan, founder of AVM Productions. It was simultaneously shot in Tamil as Penn and Telugu as Sangham, with Vyjayanthimala starring as the female lead in all three versions.

Soundtrack 
The film's soundtrack was composed by R. Sudarsanam and Dhaniram, while the lyrics were provided by Rajendra Krishan.

The song "Shaadi Shaadi Shaadi" sung by Kishore Kumar and "Baat Chalat Nai Chunari Rang Dari" sung by Geeta Dutt becomes the successful songs of the film.

Reception 
Upperstall's reviewer Karan Bali wrote: "As with Bahar and many of her early films, it is Vyjayanthimala's dances that are the film's saving graces although it is unintentionally funny now to see how deliberate and obviously tacky the sequences are which lead into her dances [...] Ladki too makes no real demands on 'feminist' tomboy Vyjayanthimala histrionically [...] Kishore Kumar are strictly supportive appendages at best [...] Kishore Kumar does what he can, bringing the film to life with his lively antics whenever he is on screen. One sees his potential for zany comedy that would go on to flower fully in films like Aasha (1957), Chalti Ka Naam Gaadi (1958) and Half Ticket (1962)".

Box office 
At the end of its theatrical run, the film grossed around 1,50,00,000, and became the second highest-grossing film of 1953 with a verdict of "hit".

References

External links 
 

1953 films
1950s Hindi-language films
Indian black-and-white films
Indian romantic comedy films
Indian multilingual films
1953 romantic comedy films
1950s multilingual films
Films directed by M. V. Raman